The Laois Senior Football Championship is an annual Gaelic football competition contested by top-tier Laois GAA clubs. The Laois County Board of the Gaelic Athletic Association has organised it since 1888.

Portarlington are the title holders (2022) defeating O'Dempsey's in the Final.

Honours
The trophy presented to the winners is the Jack Delaney Cup.

The winners of the Laois Senior Championship qualify to represent their county in the Leinster Senior Club Football Championship. They often do well outside the county, with the likes of Portlaoise (1971, 1976, 1982, 1987, 2004, 2009) among the clubs from Laois to win at least one Leinster Championship after winning the Laois Senior Football Championship. The winners can, in turn, go on to play in the All-Ireland Senior Club Football Championship. In 1982–83, Portlaoise became the first club from Laois to win All-Ireland Senior Football Championship after winning the Leinster and Laois Senior Football Championships.

List of finals
(r) = replay

Notes
† The 1889, 1897, 1906 and 1907 titles were won under the name Maryborough, now Portlaoise.

Wins listed by club

References

External links
Official Laois Website
Laois on Hoganstand
Leinster Express

 
1
Senior Gaelic football county championships